De Levie is a surname. Notable people with this name include:

 Alvin F. de Levie, American lawyer and member of the Penn State Board of Trustees
 Elka de Levie (1905–1979), Dutch gymnast and Holocaust survivor
 Robert de Levie (born 1933), Dutch chemist

See also